Krister Ericsson (born 25 September 1965) is a retired Swedish football midfielder.

References

1965 births
Living people
Swedish footballers
Nyköpings BIS players
IFK Norrköping players
Degerfors IF players
Association football midfielders
Allsvenskan players